In mathematics, a directrix is a curve associated with a process generating a geometric object, such as:
 Directrix (conic section)
 Directrix (generatrix)
 Directrix (rational normal scroll)

Other uses
Directrix is a spaceship in the Lensman series of novels by E. E. Smith.
Directrix is the name of a Dubai-based alternative rock band.